Kysta is a village and municipality in the Trebišov District in the Košice Region of eastern Slovakia.

History
In historical records the village was first mentioned in 1272.

Geography
The village lies at an altitude of 151 metres and covers an area of 8.153 km².
It has a population of about 410 people.

Ethnicity
The village is 99% Slovak.

Facilities
The village has a public library and a football pitch.

External links
https://web.archive.org/web/20070427022352/http://www.statistics.sk/mosmis/eng/run.html

Villages and municipalities in Trebišov District